Justin Utley (born ) is an American rock singer and songwriter.

Biography
Born and raised in West Valley City, Utah, Justin Utley began his career as a Mormon-Contemporary singer/songwriter, touring throughout the west United States to mostly religious and faith-based audiences during the late-1990s.  In 2002, he was a featured performer at the Salt Lake City 2002 Winter Olympics, and earned numerous awards during his time in Utah, including "Best Singer and Songwriter" by Salt Lake City Weekly and "Best New Artist" by Indie Review Monthly. The Utah native also composed and performed the theme song to the Emmy Award-winning PBS movie "The Shadow of Light", as well as other independent films.

Utley released his first-ever nationally distributed album Runaway on Kolob Records in November 2005 and a remix EP entitled Hold You + Remixes was released in April 2006, which included a live version of the title track recorded at the Javitz Center in New York City. After publicly breaking ties with the LDS Church and sending his own "self-excommunication letter", Justin became a noted activist and advocate for civil rights and LGBT equality in the United States, and an outspoken personality against the LDS church's use of conversion therapy, a method Utley endured for two years after serving a two-year full-time mission for the church. In June 2010, Utley released Stand for Something – a single written to inspire and motivate to take action towards securing LGBT equality in America, ending youth homelessness, and increasing community awareness. The single was nominated by the LGBT Academy Of Recording Arts for 4 OutMusic Awards, including Best Songwriter and Artist of the Year, winning Best Country/Folk Song of the Year. Another version of the single was released in October 2010 which included two additional live tracks and an acoustic version of songs from the album 'Runaway'.

Theatrically, his credits include a seven-month Utah regional run as "Joseph" in Joseph and the Amazing Technicolor Dreamcoat (2001–2002) and as leading man "Radames" in the Utah premiere of Elton John and Tim Rice's Broadway hit Aida (2005). Later, he would leave his Mormon-inherited religion behind, relocate to Manhattan and debut in the New York City theater scene as "Tommy Dautry" in the musical 'Our Country' (2009). The show garnered the Best Musical, and Justin as Best Actor awards for the Planet Connections Theater Festivity. The show went on to be featured in the New York Musical Theater Festival in the summer of 2010.

Justin's next full-length album, 'Nothing This Real', was released November 11, 2011 to critical acclaim.

In 2012, actor Ronnie Kerr licensed some of Utley's music for his film, 'Saltwater'.  Utley agreed, and flew to Los Angeles for a guest appearance in the film.

In July 2019, Utley released a new single "Survivors", a pop version of the orchestrated song featured from his third album, Scars, released September 10, 2020 (World Suicide Prevention Day) along with a music video to the title track.

Discography

Studio albums

Extended plays

Singles

Other appearances

References

External links 
 Official Website

American male singers
Songwriters from Utah
Former Latter Day Saints
American LGBT musicians
People from West Valley City, Utah
Living people
American male pianists
21st-century American pianists
21st-century American male musicians
Year of birth missing (living people)
American male songwriters